Beech Creek is a  long 2nd order tributary to Stewarts Creek in Surry County, North Carolina.

Variant names
According to the Geographic Names Information System, it has also been known historically as:
Beach Creek

Course 
Beech Creek rises in a pond about 0.25 miles south of Red Brush, North Carolina, in Surry County and then flows east-southeast to join Stewarts Creek on the west side of Mount Airy, North Carolina.

Watershed 
Beech Creek drains  of area, receives about 47.5 in/year of precipitation, has a wetness index of 366.84, and is about 28% forested.

See also 
 List of Rivers of North Carolina

References 

Rivers of Surry County, North Carolina
Rivers of North Carolina